Alfred E. Humphreys (August 9, 1953 – January 31, 2018) was a Canadian actor.

Early life
Humphreys was born in Haileybury, Ontario, Canada. He was the son of Leslie and Gabrielle Humphreys.

Career
Humphreys was a dramatic actor who first acted on stage with a troupe in North Bay, Canada. His breakthrough role was as the Deputy Lester in First Blood (1982), which starred Sylvester Stallone as Rambo. His other memorable roles include the character Howard Landers in My Bloody Valentine (1981) and William Drake in the blockbuster film X2 (2003). He also starred in two horror films directed by William Fruet: Funeral Home (1980) and Bedroom Eyes (1984). He also played supporting parts in such films as Act of Vengeance (1986), Ernest Rides Again (1993), Luna: Spirit of the Whale (2007) and Air Bud: Spikes Back (2003). In 2010, he appeared in Diary of a Wimpy Kid as Robert Jefferson, a role he would reprise in the film's sequels Diary of a Wimpy Kid: Rodrick Rules (2011), Diary of a Wimpy Kid: Dog Days (2012) and Diary of a Wimpy Kid: Class Clown (2012). Humphreys also appeared in Duke released in April 2012, as character 'Joe'.

Humphreys played numerous small guest roles in television shows throughout the 1980s up to the present including the role of Dr. Pomerantz on the Sci-Fi show The X Files, as well as roles on The Twilight Zone (the 1985 and 2002 revivals), Smallville, Outer Limits and Da Vinci's Inquest.

Personal life
Humphreys’ was married to Elizabeth Moss. They had one son Kess and two daughters Kirastyn and Ainsley from Liz's previous marriage.

Death
Humphreys died  of brain cancer on January 31, 2018, in Stratford, Ontario, Canada. He was 64.

Selected filmography

Virus (1980) - Sailor #2 - HMS Nereid
Funeral Home (1980) - Joe Yates
My Bloody Valentine (1981) - Howard Landers
Improper Channels (1981) - Orderly #2
Gas (1981) - Lou Picard
If You Could See What I Hear (1982) - Freddy
First Blood (1982) - Deputy Lester
Finders Keepers (1984) - Mulholland
Bedroom Eyes (1984) - Cantrell
Honeymoon (1985) - Sonny
Love and Larceny (1985) - Ralph Dugot
One Magic Christmas (1985)
Flying (1986) - Joel
Ernest Rides Again (1993) - Surgeon
The Raffle (1994) - Randy Hickock
Rumble in the Bronx (1995) - Police Officer
Falling from the Sky: Flight 174 (1995, television movie) - Cabbie
Big Bully (1996) - Teacher #2
Silence (1997)
Indefensible: The Truth About Edward Brannigan (1997, television movie) - Father Lomax
National Lampoon's Golf Punks (1998) - Jack
The Stickup (2002) - Mike O'Grady
Dead Heat (2002) - Dr. Marchesi
Final Destination 2 (2003) - Mr. Gibbons
X2 (2003) - William Drake
Little Brother of War (2003) - Phil
The Perfect Score (2004) - Tom Helton
John Tucker Must Die (2006) - Detention Teacher
The Suspect (2006) - Robert Owens
Deck the Halls (2006) - Hardware Store Employee.
The Uninvited (2009) - Priest
Diary of a Wimpy Kid (2010) - Mr. Jefferson
Diary of a Wimpy Kid: Rodrick Rules (2011) - Mr. Jefferson
Diary of a Wimpy Kid: Dog Days (2012) - Mr. Jefferson (final film role)

References

External links

1953 births
2018 deaths
Deaths from brain cancer in Canada
Male actors from Ontario
People from Temiskaming Shores
Canadian male film actors
Canadian male television actors
20th-century Canadian male actors
21st-century Canadian male actors